The Netherlands Antilles competed at the 1984 Summer Olympics in Los Angeles, United States.  The nation returned to the Olympic Games after missing the 1980 Summer Olympics.

Results by event

Athletics
Women's 100 metres
 Evelyn Farrell
 First Heat — 11.94s (→ did not advance)

Swimming
Men's 100m Freestyle 
Hilton Woods
 Heat — 53.92 (→ did not advance, 40th place)

Evert Johan Kroon
 Heat — 55.20 (→ did not advance, 51st place)

Men's 200m Freestyle
Evert Johan Kroon
 Heat — 1:57.05 (→ did not advance, 38th place)

Men's 400m Freestyle
Evert Johan Kroon
 Heat — 4:12.60 (→ did not advance, 32nd place)

Women's 100m Backstroke
Petra Bekaert
 Heat — 1:10.60 (→ did not advance, 30th place)

References
Official Olympic Reports

Nations at the 1984 Summer Olympics
1984
Oly